Very R.A.R.E. is an album by drummer Elvin Jones recorded in 1979 and originally released on the Japanese Trio label.

Reception
The Allmusic review states "This is first-rate quartet material with Pepper surging and the trio challenging him, then contrasting and complementing his solos with their own great work".

Track listing
 "Sweet Mama" (Gene Perla) - 3:55 
 "Passion Flower" (Billy Strayhorn) - 3:05 
 "Zange" (Keiko Jones) - 4:37 
 "Tin Tin Deo" (Gil Fuller, Dizzy Gillespie, Chano Pozo) - 5:14 
 "Pitter Pat" (Richard Davis) - 6:22 
 "The Witching Hour" (Roland Hanna) - 3:39

Personnel
Elvin Jones  - drums
Art Pepper - alto saxophone (tracks 1, 3, 4 & 6)
Roland Hanna - piano (tracks 1-4 & 6) 
Richard Davis - bass

References

Elvin Jones albums
1980 albums
Albums recorded at Van Gelder Studio